Many places have exonyms, names for places that differs from that used in the official or well-established language within that place, in the Albanian language.

Albanian has a relatively small number of true exonyms in areas beyond the current borders of Albania and Kosovo, mostly in neighboring countries, and those are listed here.

In addition, Albanian is a language with phonetic spelling that includes orthographic exonymy, i.e. it renders the names of non-Albanian places and people phonetically according to Albanian orthography.  
For example, Manchester is written as Mançester, Los Angeles as Los Anxheles, and New York as Nju Jork, etc. These are not listed here.

Grammatical forms of Albanian placenames
True Albanian exonyms, not mere orthographic exonyms, like all Albanian placenames can be rendered in two forms the same way as common nouns, the definite and indefinite forms.  These forms are created with postpositions to the placename.

When using English or another foreign language, Albanians tend to use the definite form but on road signs and other similar usage, the indefinite form is used because there is an implied preposition në, meaning "to" or "in", which is followed by the indefinite.  Maps, especially those produced in Albania, consistently use the indefinite form.

The two forms are applied differently depending on grammatical gender of the word.  "Recommended international usage for Albanian toponyms" in Kosovo has feminine place names appearing in the definite form and masculine place names in the indefinite form.  However, in Albania, English usage is of the indefinite for both feminine and masculine placenames except for the capital, Tirana. Masculine nouns usually take the suffix -i and feminine ones the suffix -a (which overrides a final -ë).

Afghanistan

Austria

Azerbaijan

Belgium

Bosnia and Herzegovina

Bulgaria

Canada

China

Croatia

Cyprus

Czechia

Denmark

Egypt

Estonia

Germany

Greece

Iran

Israel

Italy

Jordan

Lebanon

Libya

Mongolia

Montenegro

Nepal

Netherlands

North Macedonia

Oman

Poland

Romania

Russia

Rwanda

Saudi Arabia

Serbia

Somalia

Switzerland

Turkey

Ukraine

United Arab Emirates

United Kingdom

United States

Uzbekistan

See also
List of European exonyms

References

Lists of exonyms
Albanian language